Madison was a town in Dane County, Wisconsin, United States. The population was 6,236 at the 2020 census. The town, although once larger, was broken up into discontinuous fragments by the much larger city of Madison, and was dissolved by merging parts of the town with the cities of Madison and Fitchburg on October 30, 2022. The majority of the town's territory was situated along Highway 12/18, comprising several neighborhoods situated between the south side of the city of Madison, and the north side of the city of Fitchburg. The town also had territory on the north side of Madison near the border with Maple Bluff, as well as a few lots on the west side of Madison near Whitney Way. The Alliant Energy Center was situated within the Town of Madison. Despite its status as an unincorporated community, the Town of Madison provided a variety of services to its residents which are typically only found in incorporated cities and villages, including police, fire and emergency medical services; sewer and water utilities; and three public parks.

History
In 1856 the Wisconsin Legislature chartered the city of Madison, leaving the remainder as the town. Most of this land was gradually incorporated into various municipalities, especially the city of Madison, leaving the town as a collection of discontinuous areas subject to annexation. The dissolution took place on schedule.

Geography

Demographics

As of the census of 2010, there were 6,279 people, 2,852 households, and 1,212 families residing in the town. The population density was 4,234.1 people per square mile (1,669.5/km2). There were 3,069 housing units at an average density of 2,069.5 per square mile (799/km2). The racial makeup of the town was 54.6% White, 20.1% Black or African American, 0.9% Native American, 5.9% Asian, 0.0% Pacific Islander, 13.7% from other races, and 4.8% from two or more races. 28.0% of the population were Hispanic or Latino of any race.

There were 2,852 households, out of which 25.4% had children under the age of 18 living with them, 22.6% were married couples living together, 13.6% had a female householder with no husband present, and 57.5% were non-families. 41.8% of all households were made up of individuals, and 3.7% had someone living alone who was 65 years of age or older. The average household size was 2.20 and the average family size was 3.19.

In the town, the population was spread out, with 23.2% under the age of 18, 16.8% from 18 to 25, 36.8% from 25 to 44, 18.8% from 45 to 64, and 4.4% who were 65 years of age or older. The median age was 28.6 years. For every 100 females, there were 110.9 males. For every 100 females age 18 and over, there were 109.8 males.

The median income for a household in the town was $29,766, and the median income for a family was $37,344. Males had a median income of $31,450 versus $25,795 for females. The per capita income for the town was $19,566. About 22.0% of families and 25.9% of the population were below the poverty line, including 51.2% of those under age 18 and 11.1% of those age 65 or over.

References

External links

 Town of Madison government website
 Madison – Town of Madison – Fitchburg boundary change map
 Where's the Town of Madison?

Towns in Dane County, Wisconsin
Madison, Wisconsin, metropolitan statistical area
Towns in Wisconsin
1846 establishments in Wisconsin Territory
2022 disestablishments in Wisconsin
Former populated places in Wisconsin
Populated places disestablished in 2022